Valstad is a Norwegian surname. Notable people with the surname include:

Bjørnar Valstad (born 1967), Norwegian orienteer
Otto Valstad (1862–1950), Norwegian painter, illustrator and writer
Tilla Valstad (1871–1957), Norwegian writer and journalist

Norwegian-language surnames